One Wild Oat is a comedy play by the British writer Vernon Sylvaine which premiered in 1948. Its West End run was at the Garrick Theatre with direction by the veteran entertainer Jack Buchanan. It ran for 508 performances from December 1948 to February 1950. The cast originally included Robertson Hare and Alfred Drayton, who had appeared together in several of Sylvaine's farces and their subsequent film adaptations. In 1949, following the death of Drayton, his role was taken over first by Arthur Riscoe and then Hartley Power.

Synopsis
Two feuding neighbors, a barrister and a bookmaker, join forces to try and prevent their secret pasts from coming back to haunt them.

Film Adaptation

In 1951 the play was adapted into a film made at the Riverside Studios in Hammersmith and starring Robertson Hare and Stanley Holloway. The film featured a brief cameo role from Audrey Hepburn.

References

Bibliography
 Wearing, J.P. The London Stage 1940-1949: A Calendar of Productions, Performers, and Personnel.  Rowman & Littlefield, 2014.

1948 plays
British plays adapted into films
Plays by Vernon Sylvaine
Plays set in London
Comedy plays
West End plays